Honika may refer to:
 Hanukkah, Jewish religious holiday
 Honikas, Greek team within Argolida Football Clubs Association

See also 
 Honecker (surname)